Sri Muthukumaran Institute of Technology (SMIT), popularly known as SMIT, is an engineering institution located in Mangadu, Chennai, Tamil Nadu, India.

References 

All India Council for Technical Education
Engineering colleges in Chennai
Colleges affiliated to Anna University
Educational institutions established in 1996
1996 establishments in Tamil Nadu